The western thornbill (Acanthiza inornata) is a species of bird in the family Acanthizidae.
It is endemic to southwestern Australia.

Its natural habitat is Mediterranean-type shrubby vegetation.

References

western thornbill
Endemic birds of Southwest Australia
western thornbill
Taxonomy articles created by Polbot